Doungel is an Indian surname. Notable people with the surname include:

Chengjapao Doungel, Thadou chief in Colonial India
Chungkhokai Doungel, Indian politician
Seiminlen Doungel (born 1994), Indian football striker 

Indian surnames